Henry Dickerson McDaniel (September 4, 1836 – July 25, 1926), was the 52nd Governor of Georgia from 1883 to 1886.

Early life
Henry Dickerson McDaniel was born on September 4, 1836 in Monroe, Georgia to Ira McDaniel. Ira McDaniel was one of the first professors of Mercer University. McDaniel attended high school in Atlanta. He graduated with a Bachelor of Arts from Mercer University in 1856. He established a law practice in Monroe in 1857. He later attended the University of Georgia and received a LL.D in 1906. He was the youngest delegate to Georgia's secession convention in 1861.

Civil War
McDaniel joined the Confederate States Army on July 2, 1861 as a first lieutenant of the 11th Georgia Infantry Regiment. McDaniel was promoted to major in November 1862. McDaniel first attracted attention during the American Civil War for taking command of the 11th Georgia Infantry after the death of his officers at the Battle of Gettysburg. On July 10, 1863, he was shot by a Union soldier at Funkstown, Maryland. Two days later, he was captured by Union troops in Hagerstown, Maryland. He was hospitalized at Point Lookout and then transferred to Johnson's Island in Sandusky, Ohio. He remained in a POW camp until July 1865.

Political career
McDaniel was a member of the Democratic Party. After the war, McDaniel entered Georgia state politics. He served in the House from 1872 to 1874 and in the Senate from 1874 to 1882.

McDaniel was elected Governor of Georgia to complete the term of Alexander Stephens, who died shortly after his inauguration in 1883. He served out Stephens' term and was re-elected as governor in 1884. During his administration, the Georgia School of Technology was established, and construction began on the new State Capitol. He signed the General Local Option Liquor Law into effect on September 18, 1885 as part of the Temperance Movement in Georgia.

Personal life
McDaniel met Hester C. Felker at the Female Academy in 1857. He wrote letters to her throughout the war and while held prisoner. After the war, McDaniel returned to Monroe, where he married Hester C. Felker on December 20, 1865. Felker's father did not approve of the marriage, but Henry and Hester McDaniel were married for sixty years. The couple had two children, Sanders and Gipsy.

His home, the McDaniel-Tichenor House, was listed with the National Register of Historic Places in 1980.

Death
McDaniel died at his home in Monroe on July 25, 1926. He was interred at Monroe Cemetery.

See also
List of signers of the Georgia Ordinance of Secession

References

McDaniel-Tichenor History - Page at the Georgia Trust for Historic Preservation

Further reading
 Georgia, and Henry D. McDaniel. Message of Gov. Henry D. McDaniel, to the General Assembly of Georgia, November 1884. Atlanta, Ga: Jas. P. Harrison & Co. [State Printers], 1885.
 Herringshaw, Thomas William.  McDaniel, Henry Dickerson. Herringshaw's National Library of American Biography : Contains Thirty-Five Thousand Biographies of the Acknowledged Leaders of Life and Thought of the United States; Illustrated with Three Thousand Vignette Portraits. v4.
 McDaniel, Henry D., Hester Felker McDaniel, and Anita B. Sams. With Unabated Trust: Major Henry McDaniel's Love Letters from Confederate Battlefields As Treasured in Hester McDaniel's Bonnet Box. [s.l.]: Historical Society of Walton County, 1977.
 "McDaniel, Henry Dickerson: Thirty-Fourth Governor of Georgia". National Cyclopedia of American Biography. 1. 1898.
 McDaniel, Henry D. Henry Dickerson McDaniel Letter. 1894.
 McDaniel, Henry D., et al. Henry Dickerson McDaniel Directorship Records. 1870.
 McDaniel, Henry D., et al. Henry Dickerson McDaniel Family Papers. 1838.
 University of Georgia, and Henry D. McDaniel. Statement from Ex-Governor McDaniel, Chairman, of the Board of Trustees of the University of Georgia, As to Questions between That Board and the G.N. and I. College. Atlanta: Foote & Davies, 1917.

External links
 

1836 births
1926 deaths
Mercer University alumni
University of Georgia alumni
Democratic Party governors of Georgia (U.S. state)
Democratic Party Georgia (U.S. state) state senators
Democratic Party members of the Georgia House of Representatives
Georgia (U.S. state) lawyers
Confederate States Army officers
People of Georgia (U.S. state) in the American Civil War
American Civil War prisoners of war
Signers of the Georgia Ordinance of Secession
19th-century American lawyers
Henry